In mathematics, Higman's lemma states that the set of finite sequences over a finite alphabet, as partially ordered by the subsequence relation, is well-quasi-ordered. More generally this remains true when the alphabet is not necessarily finite, but is itself well-quasi-ordered, and the subsequence relation allows the replacement of symbols by earlier symbols in the well-quasi-ordering of labels. This is a special case of the later Kruskal's tree theorem. It is named after Graham Higman, who published it in 1952.

Reverse-mathematical calibration

References

Wellfoundedness
Order theory
Lemmas